Dog Justice is a 1928 American silent action film directed by Jerome Storm and starring Edward Hearn and Nita Martan.

Cast
 Ranger the Dog as Ranger 
 Edward Hearn as Jimmie O'Neil 
 Nita Martan as Babbette 
 Jim Welch as Baptiste, her grandfather
 Albert J. Smith as Pierre La Grande, prospector
 John Northpole as Flint, mine owner

References

Bibliography
 Munden, Kenneth White. The American Film Institute Catalog of Motion Pictures Produced in the United States, Part 1. University of California Press, 1997.

External links
 

1928 films
1920s action films
American silent feature films
American action films
American black-and-white films
Films directed by Jerome Storm
Film Booking Offices of America films
1920s English-language films
1920s American films